Emily Prager is an American author and journalist. Prager grew up in Texas, Taiwan, and Greenwich Village, New York City. She is a graduate of the Brearley School, Barnard College and has a master's degree in Applied Linguistics. She has written for The Daily Telegraph,  
The New York Times, Penthouse, The Guardian, and Village Voice.

Career
Prager starred in the daily TV soap opera The Edge of Night from 1968 to 1972.  She was later a contributing editor of The National Lampoon, a performer on The National Lampoon Radio Hour and worked and appeared in the High School Yearbook Parody. Her also work appeared in Titters, A Book of Humor by Women. She was a writer for, and briefly a cast member of Saturday Night Live in 1981.  Although she did not appear in the single episode for which she was credited as a featured player (the last episode of the 1980–1981 season, with Jr. Walker and the All-Stars as musical guests, but there was no definitive host, even though some sources claim that Chevy Chase hosted this episode), she appeared uncredited in five episodes, between 1977 and 1981. Prager is one in a handful of microscopically short-lived cast members, joining Laurie Metcalf (who did appear on the episode Prager didn't, but only on Weekend Update), SCTV cast member Catherine O'Hara (who quit after being hired on SNL and didn't appear in the season six finale), and Shane Gillis (who was fired two weeks before he could appear in the season 45 premiere when evidence of him using racist, sexist, homophobic, and anti-Asian language was uncovered).

She was a writer-performer in the cult film  Mr. Mike's Mondo Video and Robert Longo's Arena Brains. Her works include a compendium of her humor writing, In the Missionary Position, the acclaimed short story collection A Visit From the Footbinder and Other Stories, the novels Eve's Tattoo, Clea and Zeus Divorce, and Roger Fishbite, and a memoir, Wuhu Diary.  She has been a columnist for the Village Voice, The New York Times, The Daily Telegraph, Penthouse, and The Guardian. She is a Literary Lion of the New York Public Library and in the year 2000, she received the first online journalism award for commentary given by Columbia University Graduate School of Journalism. She taught at the Shanghai American School (Pudong Campus) in Shanghai, China. Dana Elcar was her stepfather.

Writings

Novels
 Clea and Zeus Divorce (1987)
 Eve's Tattoo (1991)
 Roger Fishbite (1999)

Collections
 A Visit From the Footbinder and Other Stories (1982)
 In the Missionary Position: 25 Years of Humour Writing (1999)

Memoir
 Wuhu Diary: On Taking My Adopted Daughter Back to Her Hometown in China (2001)

Miscellaneous
 World War II Resistance Stories (1979, with Arthur Prager)
 The Official I-Hate-Video Games Handbook (1982)

Contributor
 Titters, A Book of Humor by Women (1976)
 The National Lampoon – Contributing Editor

Television and filmography
 Arena Brains
 The Edge of Night
 Tarzoon: Shame of the Jungle
 Mr. Mike's Mondo Video
 The National Lampoon Radio Hour
Saturday Night Live (Season 6; 1 episode; Uncredited extra between years of 1977 and 1981; credited as a featured player in 1981; however never physically appeared on air; likewise she never actually appeared; in any single given individually; skits.)

Awards
 2000, Online Journalism Award for Commentary, Columbia University Graduate School of Journalism

References

External links 

 Emily Prager's page at Random House

1948 births
20th-century American actresses
20th-century American journalists
20th-century American novelists
20th-century American women writers
21st-century American journalists
21st-century American women writers
21st-century American memoirists
American comedy writers
American women journalists
American women novelists
Barnard College alumni
Brearley School alumni
Living people